George Edward Gray  (July 17, 1873 – August 14, 1913) was a pitcher who played briefly for the Pittsburgh Pirates during the  season.

External links
Baseball Reference

1873 births
1913 deaths
Pittsburgh Pirates players
Baseball players from Maine
People from Rockland, Maine
Major League Baseball pitchers
19th-century baseball players
Boston Reds (minor league) players
Bangor Millionaires players
Toronto Canucks players
Buffalo Bisons (minor league) players
Columbus Buckeyes (minor league) players
Columbus Senators players
Kansas City Blues (baseball) players
Providence Grays (minor league) players
Scranton Miners players
Johnstown Johnnies players
York Penn Parks players
American expatriate baseball players in Canada